No. 1 (Indian) Service Flying Training School (No. 1 (I) SFTS) was a training school that was established to train Indian pilots during the Second World War. It became part of the Indian Air Force after the war.

Unit history
The unit was previously No. 1 (Indian) Flying Training School which had formed at RAF Ambala on 1 November 1940 however on 21 July 1941 it was then renamed to No. 1 (Indian) Service Flying Training School.

Aircraft operated
 Hawker Hart
 Hawker Audax
 North American Harvard IIB
 Hawker Hurricane IIB
 Hurricane IIC
 Hurricane IID
 Hurricane IV
 Supermarine Spitfire Vc
 Spitfire VIII
 Spitfire XIV
 Airspeed Oxford
 Avro Anson

Disbandment
The unit disbanded on 1 April 1946 at RAF Ambala.

References

Citations

Bibliography

External links
 https://web.archive.org/web/20120803171431/http://www.bharat-rakshak.com/IAF/History/1940s/Trg-1SFTS.html
 https://web.archive.org/web/20120803012709/http://www.bharat-rakshak.com/IAF/History/1940s/Trg-1SFTS02.html

Military units and formations of the Indian Air Force
Indian